PartSource Inc. is a Canadian automotive parts retail chain owned by Canadian Tire. It sells name brand automotive parts, specializing in commercial sales and sales to customers who work on their own vehicles.

Founded in 1996, the retailer has 80 stores in Nova Scotia, Ontario, Manitoba, Saskatchewan, and Alberta. Originally composed of corporately owned and franchise-operated stores, as of November 2013 all PartSource stores are owned and operated by Canadian Tire Corporation.

Most of the 15,000 products are name brand items.

As of March 6, 2015 PartSource no longer offers a 10% price match guarantee. Prior to this they would match and beat any local competitor's price by 10%.

External links
PartSource Website

Canadian Tire
Automotive part retailers
Retail companies of Canada
Companies based in Vaughan
Retail companies established in 1999
2013 mergers and acquisitions
1999 establishments in Ontario